Haq (also Romanized as Heq; also known as Hek) is a village in Haq Rural District, Nalus District, Oshnavieh County, West Azerbaijan Province, Iran. At the 2006 census, its population was 927, in 155 families.

References 

Populated places in Oshnavieh County